The Central District of Jiroft County is a district (bakhsh) in Jiroft County, Kerman Province, Iran. At the 2006 census, its population was 143,590, in 30,350 families.  The district has one city: Jiroft. The district has five rural districts (dehestan): Dowlatabad Rural District, Esfandaqeh Rural District, Eslamabad Rural District, Halil Rural District, and Khatunabad Rural District.

References 

Jiroft County
Districts of Kerman Province